The Bay Area Air Quality Management District (BAAQMD) is a public agency that regulates the stationary sources of air pollution in the nine counties of California's San Francisco Bay Area: Alameda, Contra Costa, Marin, Napa, San Francisco, San Mateo, Santa Clara, southwestern Solano, and southern Sonoma. The BAAQMD is governed by a 24-member Board of Directors composed of elected officials from each of the nine Bay Area counties. The board has the duty of adopting air pollution regulations for the district. It is one of 35 Air Quality Management Districts in California.

History
The first meeting of the Bay Area Air Pollution Control District (as it was initially known) board of directors was on November 16, 1955, possessing the duty of regulating the sources of stationary air pollution in the San Francisco Bay Area, that is, most sources of air pollution with the exception of automobiles and aircraft.   

 1957 - The Air District banned open burning at wrecking yards;  
 1958 - The Air District limited industrial emissions in 1958; 
 1958 - the Air District opened its first analytical laboratory; 
 1960 - The Air District banned open burning at dumps; 
 1962 - Ambient air monitoring network established; 
 1968 - The Air District later began to regulate agricultural burning in 1968;  
 1970 - Backyard burning banned;  
 1971 - the Air District adopted emissions standards for lead;  
 1971 - Napa, Solano, and Sonoma counties became members of the Air District;  
 1972 - The Air District began making daily air quality broadcasts through the "smog phone";  
 1972 - The board adopted the first odor regulation in the United States;   
 1974 - California's first gasoline vapor recovery program was started;  
 1975 - The country's first air quality ozone model was completed by the Air District;  
 1978 - The Bay Area Air Pollution Control District changed its name to the Bay Area Air Quality Management District;  
 1980 - The Air District proposed a "Smog Check" program, one that would be adopted statewide by 1982.   
 1989 - The Air District adopted the nation's first limits on emissions from commercial bakeries and marine vessel loading;  
 1990 - The Air District adopted regulations for emissions from aerosol spray products;  
 1991 - The Spare the Air program was started, made to notify the public of when air quality is forecast to exceed federal standards;  
 1996 - The Air District founded its vehicle buyback program, intended to buy and scrap older, more polluting automobiles;  
 1998 - The Air District began administrating the Carl Moyer Program to reduce emissions by upgrading heavy-duty diesel engines;  
 1998 and 1999 - The Air District took steps to reduce particulate matter, primarily through regulating woodburning appliances and monitoring particulate matter through pre-existing air quality monitoring stations;  
 2005 - The Air District began to regulate emissions from refinery flares;  
 2008 - The Board passed a law that makes the previously voluntary compliance with wood burning regulations a crime. Citizens wishing to use wood burning appliances during winter months now must check if a Spare the Air alert is in effect, which would prohibit residential wood burning, with certain exemptions.

Governing board 
The Air District's board of directors is made up of 24 locally appointed representatives from 9 Bay Area counties. Each county's population determines the number of representatives on the Board, as follows:

 < 300,000: 1 representative each (Marin and Napa)
 300,000-750,000: 2 representatives each (Solano and Sonoma)
 750,000-1,000,000: 3 representatives each (San Francisco and San Mateo)
 >1,000,000: 4 representatives each (Alameda, Contra Costa, and Santa Clara)

Board members are appointed by their County's Board of Supervisors and/or their County's City Selection Committee.

In addition, the Board has 12 standing committees on which the board members sit.

Uses of data

BAAQMD oversees regional data on air pollution and has the authority to declare Spare the Air alerts, when residents should take extra precautions when going outside and may be prohibited from engaging in activities such as burning.  511 Contra Costa built an RSS feed using these data, and released an iPhone application to alert people with allergies or  other environmental sensitivities about air quality alerts.

Divisions

Administration: http://www.baaqmd.gov/Divisions/Administration.aspx

Communications: https://www.baaqmd.gov/news-and-events/press-releases

Compliance & Enforcement: http://www.baaqmd.gov/Divisions/Compliance-and-Enforcement.aspx

Engineering:  http://www.baaqmd.gov/Divisions/Engineering.aspx

Finance: http://www.baaqmd.gov/Divisions/Finance.aspx

Human Resources: http://www.baaqmd.gov/Divisions/Human-Resources.aspx

Information Services: http://www.baaqmd.gov/Divisions/Information-Services.aspx

Legal: http://www.baaqmd.gov/Divisions/Legal.aspx

Planning, Rules & Research: http://www.baaqmd.gov/Divisions/Planning-and-Research.aspx

Strategic Incentives: http://www.baaqmd.gov/Divisions/Strategic-Incentives.aspx

Technical Services: http://www.baaqmd.gov/Divisions/Technical-Services.aspx

Notable facilities in jurisdiction
Some example stationary sources in the BAAQMD jurisdiction are:
The Shaw Group waste ponds, Martinez
Pacific Gas and Electric
Shell Oil refinery, Martinez
Chevron Corporation refinery, Richmond, Ca

See also
Spare the Air
Carl Moyer Program
Association of Bay Area Governments
Metropolitan Transportation Commission (San Francisco Bay Area)
California Air Resources Board
South Coast Air Quality Management District
List of California air districts

References

External links
Bay Area Air Quality Management District
Spare the Air website
Carl Moyer Program
 Managing TitleV Compliance
 Clean air reference website
 Fireplace Rebate Fund
BAAQMD phone numbers including 800-EXHAUST (800-394-2878) to report smoggy cars

Government in the San Francisco Bay Area
Air pollution in California
Environment of the San Francisco Bay Area
1955 establishments in California